, provisionally known as 2005 TB190, is a trans-Neptunian object (TNO) with an absolute magnitude of 4.4.

Orbit 

 is classified as scattered-extended by the Deep Ecliptic Survey (DES), because its orbit appears to be beyond significant gravitational interactions with Neptune's current orbit. However, if Neptune migrated outward, there would have been a period when Neptune had a higher eccentricity. The aphelion of  lies at 104 AU.

Simulations by Emel’yanenko and Kiseleva in 2007 showed that  appears to have less than a 1% chance of being in a 4:1 resonance with Neptune.

It has been observed 202 times over seven oppositions. It will come to perihelion in January 2017. There are precovery observations dating back to November 2001.

Physical properties 

As a result, its size was estimated to lie within a range from 335 to 410 km.

In the visible light,  has a moderately red spectral slope.

The TNO was found in 2009 to have a rotation period of 12.68 ±3 hours, a common value for trans-Neptunian objects of its size. Similarly-sized  has a rotation period of 11.7 ± 3 hours.

References

External links 
 

 

Scattered disc and detached objects
2005 TB190
2005 TB190
2005 TB190
Possible dwarf planets
20051011